According to the 2006 census, 62,295 citizens of North Macedonia reside in Germany, irrespective of ethnicity. They are concentrated mainly in Bavaria, Berlin, Hannover and Stuttgart.

Organisation and religion

Macedonians in Germany  are predominantly Eastern Orthodox Christians, and are mostly organised within the framework of the Macedonian Orthodox Church or the MPCO. Most of these organizations were formed in the early 1990s. The original church community was formed in Hamburg around 1980, and soon after six other MPCO's were established in Germany. The MPCOs have their own churches where many Macedonians gather for Ilinden, Easter and Christmas.
The biggest are:
MPCO-"Sv.Kliment Ohridski" from Berlin
MPCO-"Sveti Spas" from Laatzen / Hannover
MPCO-"Sv. Atanasie" from Nürnberg
MPCO-"Sv.Nikola" from Ingolstadt 
MPCO-"Sv.Kiril i Metodij" from Stuttgart
MPCO-"Sv.Troica" from München
MPCO-"Sv.Dimitrija" from Aalen
MPCO-"Sveti Kiril i Metodij" from Dortmund

The MPCO's encourage the Macedonian Orthodox Church, traditional Macedonian folklore and customs from the motherland. They also encourage the upkeep of Macedonian heritage, language and traditions in Germany.

Other Christian minority groups in the Macedonian German community include Greek Catholics, Eastern Catholics, a few Uniates and some Protestants. Smaller numbers of Macedonians are Muslims who may or may not adhere to every aspect of Islam, and many more could be nonreligious/irreligious and agnostic/secularist.

Sport
There are several Macedonian sports clubs in Germany. The best known is probably FK Makedonija 1970 from Berlin

Notable Macedonians from Germany

Igor Kirov - Dancer and choreographer from Frankfurt am Main
 Aleksandar Kondinski - Distinguised fellow of the Alexander von Humboldt Foundation currently affiliated with the University of Cambridge (Cambridge)
Oka Nikolov - Soccer player
Alexander Veljanov - Singer, songwriter

References

External links
 German-Macedonian Society web site
 FK Makedonija 1970 Berlin web site
 Macedonian Honor Consulat in Germany
 Macedonian Orthodox Church in Europe

Germany
Ethnic groups in Germany